Fantasyland Theatre, formerly Videopolis, is the name of a  outdoor amphitheater at Disneyland in Anaheim, California. Located in Fantasyland, it functions as a venue for various shows. In 1995, the location was renamed to Fantasyland Theater. In 2013, it was renamed to the English-classic spelling, Fantasyland Theatre, with the opening of the venue's most recent show Mickey and the Magical Map.

Predecessor
The original Fantasyland Theater (different spelling) opened in 1956. This theater showed Disney cartoons and Mouseketeers of The Mickey Mouse Club featured short films. In 1981, it shut down in preparation for construction of the revamped Fantasyland and was then replaced with Pinocchio's Daring Journey.

History
Videopolis opened on June 22, 1985, a short distance to the west of It's a Small World. During the day, the theater was used for theme-park shows, but in the evening, it was used as a dance club with music videos. It featured 70 video monitors that displayed music videos and/or live feeds that allowed guests to watch themselves. The venue included a snack bar called "Yumz" opening on June 19.

The theater was featured in the television program of the same name on the Disney Channel. Filmed live at Videopolis, the show broadcast concert performances from an array of Top 40 bands and singers including Debbie Gibson, New Kids on the Block, Tiffany, Glenn Medeiros, New Edition, Taylor Dayne, Pebbles, Janet Jackson, and The Jets. The dance club concept was abandoned and closed on November 26, 1989, after several high-profile gang-related incidents. Videopolis was then converted for exclusive stage-show use.

Disneyland was successfully sued on two separate occasions by members of the LGBT community in 1985 due to dancing between the same-sex being prohibited at the club. The policy was dropped in 1985.

The Children's Miracle Network Telethon also made use of Videopolis from 1982 to 1993. The show's hosts included singer and The Dukes of Hazard actor John Schneider, Marie Osmond, Entertainment Tonight co-host Mary Hart, impressionist Rich Little, Olympic Gold Medalist Mary Lou Retton, Pro Football Hall of Famer Merlin Olsen, and the 5th Dimension's Marilyn McCoo and Billy Davis Jr.

On January 29, 2020, the Videopolis dance club was briefly revived for the Disneyland After Dark: 80s Nite event.

In October 2020, it was reported that Mickey and the Magical Map along with Frozen Live at the Hyperion at Disney California Adventure would not return when the parks reopened (which eventually happened on April 30, 2021).

On December 9, 2021 it was announced that the Fantasyland Theatre will reopen in 2022 hosting 2 shows that will move from Disney California Adventure to Disneyland. "Celebrate Gospel" will run in February on multiple dates while "Tale of the Lion King" will open in Spring 2022.

Disneyland Paris

In Discoveryland at Disneyland Park, stands Videopolis; a large complex housing the Videopolis Theatre and the Hyperion Café counter service restaurant. It features one of the largest props in the resort: the Hyperion airship.

Shows

As Videopolis
 The Magic of Christmas (Christmas Seasons 1985 – 1988)
 Sing'in' Dance'in' Heigh Ho (1987)
 Circus Fantasy (1988)
 Show Biz Is (1989)
 One Man's Dream, a celebration of Walt Disney (December 16, 1989 – April 29, 1990)
 Dick Tracy in Diamond Double-Cross (June 15, 1990 – December 31, 1990)
 Plane Crazy, with characters from TaleSpin and other Disney Afternoon shows. (March 15, 1991 – September 1991)
 Mickey's Nutcracker (Christmas seasons 1991 & 1992)
 Beauty and the Beast Live on Stage (April 12, 1992 – April 30, 1995)

As Fantasyland Theater
 The Spirit of Pocahontas (June 23, 1995 – September 4, 1997)
 Animazment - The Musical (June 18, 1998 – October 21, 2001)
 Minnie's Christmas Party (Christmas Seasons 2001 & 2002)
 Mickey's Detective School (2002 – 2003)
 Snow White: An Enchanting Musical (February 2004 – September 2006)
 Disney Princess Fantasy Faire (October 2006 – August 2012)

As Fantasyland Theatre
 Mickey and the Magical Map (May 25, 2013 – October 9, 2020) October date is the official notice of closing. The final performance coincided with the closure of the Disneyland Resort due to COVID-19 pandemic stay-at-home orders.
 Tale of the Lion King (May 28, 2022 – Present)

Television
 During the 1991 and 1992 holiday seasons, Mickey's Nutcracker was televised on the Disney Channel.
 In 1998, some of the live segments of The Wiggles Live at Disneyland were televised on the Disney Channel in Australia.
 In 2022, April season, Party Gustavo Live at Disneyland were televised on the Disney Junior in Australia

References

Amusement rides introduced in 1985
Walt Disney Parks and Resorts attractions
Disneyland
Fantasyland
1985 establishments in California